The canton of Liévin is an administrative division of the Pas-de-Calais department, in northern France. It was created at the French canton reorganisation which came into effect in March 2015. Its seat is in Liévin.

It consists of the following communes: 
Éleu-dit-Leauwette 
Givenchy-en-Gohelle
Liévin
Vimy

References

Cantons of Pas-de-Calais